The United States' Gigi Fernández and Mary Joe Fernández defeated Spain's Conchita Martínez and Arantxa Sánchez Vicario in the final, 7–5, 2–6, 6–2 to win the gold medal in Women's Doubles tennis at the 1992 Summer Olympics. The Unified Team's 	Leila Meskhi and Natasha Zvereva and Australia's Rachel McQuillan and Nicole Provis won the bronze medals.

The tournament was held at the Vall d'Hebron complex on Montjuïc in Barcelona, Spain from 30 July to 7 August 1992.

The United States' Zina Garrison and Pam Shriver were the reigning gold medalists, but neither competed in this tournament.

Medalists

Seeds

Draw

Finals

Top half

Bottom half

References 
 ITF Olympic Site

1992

Women's Doubles
1992 in women's tennis
Women's events at the 1992 Summer Olympics